Francisco Oduardo (born 3 December 1949) is a Cuban boxer. He competed in the men's featherweight event at the 1968 Summer Olympics. At the 1968 Summer Olympics in Mexico City, he lost his first bout by a 2-3 decision to Miguel García of Argentina.

References

External links
 

1949 births
Living people
Cuban male boxers
Olympic boxers of Cuba
Boxers at the 1968 Summer Olympics
Boxers at the 1967 Pan American Games
Pan American Games silver medalists for Cuba
Pan American Games medalists in boxing
Boxers from Havana
Featherweight boxers
Medalists at the 1967 Pan American Games
20th-century Cuban people